Benjamin Coccio (born August 2, 1975) is an American filmmaker from Niskayuna, New York.  He is best known for his feature film work, directing Zero Day and co-writing The Place Beyond The Pines.

Biography
Coccio attended the Rhode Island School of Design, graduating in 1997 with a BFA Film/Animation/Video.

Coccio's first directorial effort was the short film 5:45am, released in 2000 by IFC. His next project was Zero Day, a fictionalized account of two high-school teens who plan and then execute a violent attack on their peers inside their high school. The film was admittedly a study of the Columbine High School massacre, and the two characters bear much resemblance to the perpetrators Eric Harris and Dylan Klebold.

In 2003, Coccio received the award for Best Director at Slamdunk Film Festival, was nominated for an Independent Spirit Award, and was named one of MovieMakers upcoming directors to watch for.

In 2005 he was awarded a Connecticut State Commission on Culture and Tourism Artist Fellowship Award in the category of Film and Video.

Coccio co-wrote The Place Beyond the Pines with director Derek Cianfrance, setting the story in his hometown of Schenectady, New York.

In 2015 Coccio narrated Part 5 of the Civilization V Battle Royale Mk. II - an event hosted by the Reddit community for the Civilization V Video Game.

Filmography
5:45 AM (2000)
Zero Day (2003)
 (2010)
The Place Beyond the Pines  (2013) (writer, story by)

References

External links
 "The Zero Day Diaries" Coccio's article on the making of Zero Day in Moviemaker Magazine Issue #51 (Summer 2003)
 "Interview with Ben Coccio" An interview with Coccio on BigSPEEGS Movie Review
 
 Professor Bright Films
 Trailer for The Beginner
 July 2012 Interview with Coccio - The Oculus Online

1975 births
Living people
People from Niskayuna, New York
Film directors from New York (state)